Sophus Mads Jørgensen (4 July 1837 – 1 April 1914) was a Danish chemist. He is considered one of the founders of coordination chemistry, and is known for the debates which he had with Alfred Werner during 1893-1899. While Jørgensen's theories on coordination chemistry were ultimately proven to be incorrect, his experimental work provided much of the basis for Werner's theories. Jørgensen also made major contributions to the chemistry of platinum and rhodium compounds.

Jørgensen was a board member of the Carlsberg Foundation from 1885 until his death in 1914, and was elected a member of the Royal Swedish Academy of Sciences in 1899.

References

George B. Kauffman. Sophus Mads Jørgensen, A Danish platinum metals pioneer. Platinum Metals Review 1992, 36, 217-223. 
H. Kragh. S. M. Jørgensen and his controversy with A. Werner: a reconsideration. British Journal for the History of Science 1997, 30, 203-219. .

Inorganic chemists
Danish chemists
1837 births
1914 deaths
Members of the Royal Swedish Academy of Sciences